Warren is a census-designated place and unincorporated community in Tyler County, Texas, United States. Its ZIP code is 77664. This was a new CDP for the 2010 census with a population of 757.

Geography
Warren is located at  (30.612665, -94.410419).

Education
The Warren Independent School District serves area students.

Notable people
John Elliott, professional football player for NY Jets
Grady Hatton, baseball player and manager.
Roy Weatherly, baseball player

References

External links 

Unincorporated communities in Texas
Census-designated places in Tyler County, Texas
Census-designated places in Texas